D.C. Follies is a syndicated sitcom which aired from 1987–1989. The show was set in a Washington, D.C. bar, where a bartender played by Fred Willard would welcome puppet caricatures of politicians and popular culture figures.

Synopsis
The show, a satire, made frequent sardonic comments on cold war and late 1980s politics and pop culture. Although Willard was the only live actor appearing regularly, each episode featured a celebrity guest, including Martin Mull, Robin Leach, Leslie Nielsen, Bob Uecker, and Betty White. In one episode, Robert Englund showed up as his Freddy Krueger character, and in a special Christmas episode an un-billed actor played Santa Claus.

Style
The show's use of puppets that mimicked popular culture and political figures was similar to the British series Spitting Image; it was produced by Sid and Marty Krofft, well-known puppeteers in the United States who were responsible for popular children's television shows including H.R. Pufnstuf and Sigmund and the Sea Monsters. The show was originally funded and syndicated nationally by New York-based Syndicast Services Inc.

Frequently appearing puppet characters included
Former Presidents Richard Nixon, Gerald Ford, Jimmy Carter, and then-President Ronald Reagan and Vice-President George H. W. Bush. When Bush was elected President in 1988, Vice-President Dan Quayle also became a regular. The former and current presidents were portrayed as having a special Presidents' Table at the bar, where they sat together.
First Ladies Nancy Reagan, Barbara Bush; and Marilyn Quayle.
Woody Allen
Jim Bakker and his then-wife, Tammy Faye Bakker
Cher
Sam Donaldson
 Senator Robert Dole
 Governor Michael Dukakis
Whoopi Goldberg
Katharine Hepburn
 Rev. Jesse Jackson
Michael Jackson
Don King
Henry Kissinger
Ted Koppel
Madonna
Sean Penn
Edwin Meese
Oliver North
Tip O'Neill
Dolly Parton
John Poindexter
Dan Rather
Geraldo Rivera
Pat Robertson
Sylvester Stallone
Oprah Winfrey
British Prime Minister Margaret Thatcher, and Queen Elizabeth II
Prince Charles and his then-wife, Princess Diana
Soviet leader Mikhail Gorbachev and wife Raisa Gorbacheva
Pope John Paul II
Iranian leader Ayatollah Khomeni
Sid and Marty Krofft themselves, as newspaper vendors

Accolades
The series was nominated for two Emmy Awards.

Home media
A series of three "Best of D. C. Follies" VHS tapes were released, with each volume containing two episodes.

On August 4, 2017, Shout! Factory announced they had acquired the rights to the series and subsequently released D.C. Follies – The Complete Series on DVD in Region 1 on November 14, 2017.

The show has been made available via video on demand at Amazon Video and iTunes.

References

External links
 
 Official website
 Sid and Marty Krofft interview about the show

1980s American political comedy television series
1980s American satirical television series
1980s American sitcoms
1987 American television series debuts
1989 American television series endings
American television series based on British television series
American television shows featuring puppetry
English-language television shows
First-run syndicated television programs in the United States
Political satirical television series
Television series by Sid and Marty Krofft Television Productions
Television series by MGM Television
Television shows set in Washington, D.C.